Karim Keira was a Guinean politician, the former Minister of the first republic of Guinea under the regime of Ahmed Sékou Touré.

He was  executed in 1985 after the failed coup d'État of Diarra Traoré. Two of his children also went on to be ministers.

Career 
A former colonial administrator, after independence he became commander of the cercle of Mamou, and then Boké before returning to Conakry. 

In 1969, he was named governor in  Siguiri in place of Sékou Camara.

In 1970, he became secretary general to the Presidency of the Republic. 

At the time of the death of Sékou Touré in 1984, he was Minister of Fisheries before being arrested and imprisoned  under the second republic lead by Lansana Conté until his death in  1985.

References

External links 

 https://www.youtube.com/watch?v=tseZjuq5OAE

Executed people
1985 deaths
Fisheries ministers of Guinea